Greg Edwards (born 24 December 1947) is a radio broadcaster and DJ.  He is well known as the founder of Capital Radio's 'Soul Spectrum' programme (from 1975 onwards) and for the promotion of PIR records and associated artists when it was formed in 1971.  He is credited as being a DJ who had a major influence on the promotion of soul and disco music in the UK during the 1970s and 1980s both on radio as well as the club circuit.

Career

Early years

Edwards was born in Grenada and raised in New York City although he moved to the UK in 1971 in order to assist in the running of the newly formed Philadelphia International record label which was founded by writer-producers Kenneth Gamble and Leon Huff.

He worked as an Executive at CBS records during this time, where he was responsible for the marketing and promotion of soul music, with acts such Earth, Wind and Fire, Lou Rawls and Johnny Nash.

Early BBC work, Capital Radio and "Soul Mafia"

Whilst still working for CBS, Edwards was approached by BBC radio producer Dave Price to stand in for the Emperor Rosko radio show in 1972.  (Rosko had to return to Los Angeles, as his father Joe Pasternak was ill).  It is here that Edwards's radio career began, working for BBC Radio 1 on the Saturday noon3pm slot.

It was Edwards's intention to promote soul and jazz music which had very little UK airplay at that time.  He also presented three editions of the long-running music show Top of the Pops, during March and April 1974.  However, he decided to leave the BBC and work for the new Independent Radio Station set up in October 1973, called Capital Radio.

It was at Capital Radio that Edwards worked alongside DJs including the late Kenny Everett, Dave Cash and Chris Tarrant.  From the mid-1970s and into the early 1980s he went on to present a Saturday early evening programme on Capital Radio called "Soul Spectrum" from 5-8pm where his infamous 'bathroom call' was announced, playing music for those who were 'getting ready to go out and party on the town'. Edwards was one of a group of DJs who became stars on the club music scene.  They were affectionately known as the ‘soul mafia’ with DJs Chris Hill, Jeff Young, Robbie Vincent and the late DJ Froggy (Steve Howlett) among them.

Edwards was well known for promoting record labels on his station.  He once said, "Buy anything that is issued on the Prelude label".  The station even issued a 'soul spectrum playlist' each Saturday which was available from the station, located in Euston Tower, London.

Lyceum Ballroom - "The Best Disco in Town"

From the late 1970s through to the early 1980s, Edwards was one of a rotation of DJs to present Capital Radio’s “Best Disco in Town”, each Friday night, from the Lyceum Ballroom in the Strand, London.  The event was also broadcast live on Capital Radio, from 11pm to midnight with a capacity of 2,000 people.  Many fans of his DJ'ing formed groups from various parts of London and the surrounding areas when he called out for those from the areas 'North, East, South and West' London each week.  'The East London Groove Platoon' and 'Croydon Cruise Control' were the names of two such groups.

Later years - DJ work including 'Caister Soul Weekender' and 'Soultasia' appearances

He has been a regular guest DJ at the Caister Soul Weekender, the UK's largest and longest running soul music event which dates back to April, 1979 and held at the Vauxhall Holiday Park in Great Yarmouth.  These were held twice each year although due to the Covid-19 outbreak cancelled in 2020 and 2021.

In May, 2015 he took part DJ'ing at the 'Happy Days Festival' held at Imber Court, a parkland and recreational facility in East Molesey, Surrey.  More recently he has DJ'd bringing his 'Soul Spectrum' classics to the 'Soultasia' event which featured music from the biggest soul & disco artists of all time.  This was held at the Promenade Park, Maldon, Essex on 24, July 2021 as a "lifetime celebration of soul & disco".  He also appeared at the 'Berkshire Soultasia' event held at Windsor Racecourse on 13, August 2021.

Current work

Edwards continues to work as a DJ, travelling to venues around the UK on a regular basis.  He also has a show on radio station Mi-Soul on Sundays from 1pm to 3pm, called 'Soul Spectrum'.

He has lived in Hampshire since 1995.  His hobbies include gardening, architecture, history and ten-pin bowling.. He has a daughter

References 
 Mi-Soul Radio Presenter Profiles Greg Edwards
 UK Community Eye TV interviews Greg Edwards by Natalie Taylor
 George Kay interviews Greg Edwards at Mi-Soul Radio

Living people
1947 births
BBC Radio 1 presenters
Black British DJs
British radio DJs
Club DJs
English people of Grenadian descent
Top of the Pops presenters